Linda Wade Gilroy (née Jarvie; born 19 July 1949) is a British Labour Co-operative politician who was the Member of Parliament (MP) for Plymouth Sutton from 1997 until her defeat at the 2010 general election by the Conservative Party candidate, Oliver Colvile.

Early life

Born Linda Wade Jarvie and educated privately at the Maynard School in Exeter, Devon and then Stirling High School, before attending the University of Edinburgh where she was awarded a master's degree in history in 1971. She finished her education at the University of Strathclyde where she received a postgraduate diploma in secretarial studies in 1972.

She joined Age Concern Scotland (now Age UK), in 1972, leaving in 1979 as a deputy director to join the Gas Consumer Council as a regional manager for the South West of England, in which capacity she founded the Devon and Cornwall energy efficiency centre, before she left in 1996.

Politics

She was elected as the secretary to the Plymouth Drake Constituency Labour Party in 1987–8, and was elected chairwoman of the Cornwall Labour Party for four years from 1990.  She unsuccessfully contested Cornwall South East at the 1992 General Election where she finished in third place some 25,029 votes behind the sitting Conservative MP Robert Hicks.  She also contested the European Parliament elections in 1994 when she was defeated at Devon East and Plymouth.

Gilroy was selected to stand for Labour in the 1997 election through an all-women shortlist. She was elected to the House of Commons at the 1997 General Election for Plymouth Sutton with a majority of 9,440 and made her maiden speech on 27 October 1997.
She was re-elected at the 2001 and the 2005 General Elections. Linda Gilroy contested the 2010 General Election in the newly created seat of Plymouth Sutton and Devonport, however she lost the seat to Oliver Colvile, who won the seat with a majority of just 1,149 votes.

In parliament she was a member of the European legislation select committee from 1997 until after the 2001 General Election when she was appointed as the Parliamentary Private Secretary to the Minister of State at the Office of the Deputy Prime Minister Nick Raynsford. She has been a member of the defence select committee since the 2005 General Election. As at August 2006 she had rebelled in just seven of 2,300 votes made. Her attendance record was 80%.

Personal life
She lives in Plymouth beside Sutton Harbour and has been married to Bernard Gilroy since 1987;

References

External links
Linda Gilroy MP official site
Labour Party – Linda Gilroy MP official biography
Guardian Unlimited Politics – Ask Aristotle: Linda Gilroy MP
TheyWorkForYou.com – Linda Gilroy MP
The Public Whip – Linda Gilroy MP voting record
BBC News – Linda Gilroy profile 10 February 2005

1949 births
Living people
Labour Co-operative MPs for English constituencies
People educated at Stirling High School
Alumni of the University of Edinburgh
Female members of the Parliament of the United Kingdom for English constituencies
Members of the Parliament of the United Kingdom for constituencies in Devon
People from Moffat
UK MPs 1997–2001
UK MPs 2001–2005
UK MPs 2005–2010
20th-century British women politicians
21st-century British women politicians
20th-century Scottish women politicians
Politicians from Plymouth, Devon